Nothing Sacred or Nothing's Sacred may refer to:

Film and television
 Nothing Sacred (film), a 1937 American screwball comedy
 Nothing Sacred (TV series), a 1997–1998 American drama series

Literature
 Nothing Sacred (novel), a 2010 novel by Boris Akunin
 Nothing Sacred (play), a 1988 play by George F. Walker adapted for a 1998 Canadian television film
Nothing Sacred, a 2004 science fiction novel by Tom Flynn
 Nothing Sacred: The Truth About Judaism, a 2003 book by Douglas Rushkoff
 Nothing's Sacred (book), a 2005 autobiography by Lewis Black

Music
 Nothing Sacred (band), a 1980s heavy metal group
 Nothing Sacred (album), by David Allan Coe, 1978
 Nothing's Sacred (album), by Lȧȧz Rockit, 1991
 Nothing Sacred, an album by Babylon A.D., 1992
 "Nothing Sacred – A Song for Kirsty", a song by Russell Watson, 2002
 "Nothing Sacred", a song by Memento from Beginnings, 2003
 "Nothing's Sacred", a song by London After Midnight from Violent Acts of Beauty, 2007

See also
 Is Nothing Sacred?, a 1983 album by the Lords of the New Church
 "Is Nothing Sacred", a 1999 song by Meat Loaf